Kesy, Kęsy or KESY may refer to:

 Kęsy-Pańki a village in Poland
 Kęsy-Wypychy a village in Poland
 KESY (FM), a radio station (91.9 FM) licensed to serve Baker City, Oregon, United States
 KRTE-FM, a radio station (107.3 FM) licensed to serve Cuba, Missouri, United States, which held the call sign KESY from 2002 to 2010

People with the surname
Jack Kesy, American theatre, television and film actor